Clifford "Cliff" Eugene Barker (January 15, 1921 – March 17, 1998) was a basketball player from the United States, who won the gold medal with the USA national basketball team at the 1948 Summer Olympics in London, United Kingdom and two national championships at the University of Kentucky.

While at the University of Kentucky, Barker was an All-SEC (Second Team) and All-SEC Tournament guard during the 1947–48 and 1948–49 seasons.

A member of the United States Army Air Forces during World War II, Barker was a B-17 Flying Fortress gunner and spent 16 months as a prisoner-of-war.

NBA 
Source

Regular season

Playoffs

See also
Fabulous Five (Kentucky Wildcats)

References

1921 births
1998 deaths
American men's basketball players
Basketball coaches from Indiana
Basketball players at the 1948 Summer Olympics
Basketball players from Indiana
Guards (basketball)
Indianapolis Olympians coaches
Indianapolis Olympians players
Kentucky Wildcats men's basketball players
Medalists at the 1948 Summer Olympics
Military personnel from Indiana
Olympic gold medalists for the United States in basketball
People from Yorktown, Indiana
United States men's national basketball team players
Washington Capitols draft picks
United States Army Air Forces personnel of World War II
World War II prisoners of war held by Germany
United States Army Air Forces soldiers
American prisoners of war in World War II